Folda or Folla is a firth and a fjord in Trøndelag county, Norway. It is located within the municipalities of Flatanger, Namsos, and Nærøysund. The narrower fjord part of Folda is often called the Foldfjorden or Innerfolda. Most of the fjord is very narrow, some places with steep cliffs. It has the largest length to width factor among Norway's fjords. The fjord is crossed by the Norwegian County Road 17 road using the Folda Bridge at the village of Foldereid. Spruce forests cover most areas around the fjord. The outer-Folda area is notorious for its rough seas, and has been called an "ocean graveyard".

See also
 List of Norwegian fjords

References

Fjords of Trøndelag
Flatanger
Namsos
Nærøysund